Junior Relaxer is the third album by Canadian alternative rock band King Cobb Steelie, released in 1997. The album's main single "Rational", a tribute to Nigerian activist Ken Saro-Wiwa, was the band's biggest hit.

Prior to the album's release, the band had played several live shows of improvisational music using Junior Relaxer as a pseudonym. 

Guest musicians on the album include Kinnie Starr, Nic Gotham, DJ Serious and Don Pyle.

Track listing
 Starvo
 Pass the Golden Falcon
 Rational
 Functions and Relations
 Power of Love
 Champion of Versatility 	
 You Should Be Getting Something 	
 Highly Conductive 	
 Doomed Thinking Man vs. Stupid Action Man 	
 Swiss Crumb 	
 Quo Vadis 	
 Irrational (Incarnate Perspective)

References 

1997 albums
King Cobb Steelie albums